Cleavage stimulation factor 77 kDa subunit is a protein that in humans is encoded by the CSTF3 gene.

The protein encoded by this gene is one of three (including CSTF1 and CSTF2) cleavage stimulation factors that combine to form the cleavage stimulation factor complex (CSTF). This complex is involved in the polyadenylation and 3' end cleavage of pre-mRNAs. The encoded protein functions as a homodimer and interacts directly with both CSTF1 and CSTF2 in the CSTF complex. Alternative splicing results in multiple transcript variants encoding different isoforms.

Interactions
CSTF3 has been shown to interact with CSTF2.

References

External links

Further reading